Spirulina is a biomass of cyanobacteria (blue-green algae) that can be consumed by humans and animals. The three species are  Arthrospira platensis, A. fusiformis, and A. maxima.

Cultivated worldwide, Arthrospira is used as a dietary supplement or whole food. It is also used as a feed supplement in the aquaculture, aquarium, and poultry industries.

Etymology and ecology 

The species A. maxima and A. platensis were once classified in the genus Spirulina. The common name, spirulina, refers to the dried biomass of A. platensis, which belongs to photosynthetic bacteria that cover the groups Cyanobacteria and Prochlorophyta. Scientifically, a distinction exists between spirulina and the genus Arthrospira. Species of Arthrospira have been isolated from alkaline brackish and saline waters in tropical and subtropical regions. Among the various species included in the genus Arthrospira, A. platensis is the most widely distributed and is mainly found in Africa, but also in Asia. A. maxima is believed to be found in California and Mexico. The term spirulina remains in use for historical reasons.

Arthrospira species are free-floating, filamentous cyanobacteria characterized by cylindrical, multicellular trichomes in an open left-handed helix. They occur naturally in tropical and subtropical lakes with high pH and high concentrations of carbonate and bicarbonate. A. platensis occurs in Africa, Asia, and South America, whereas A. maxima is confined to Central America. Most cultivated spirulina is produced in open-channel raceway ponds, with paddle wheels used to agitate the water.

They are autotrophic, meaning that they are able to make their own food, and do not need a living energy or organic carbon source. A nutrient feed for growing it is:

 Baking soda 
 Potassium nitrate 
 Sea salt- 
 Potassium phosphate 
 Iron sulphate

Historical use
Spirulina was a food source for the Aztecs and other Mesoamericans until the 16th century; the harvest from Lake Texcoco in Mexico and subsequent sale as cakes were described by one of Cortés' soldiers. The Aztecs called it tecuitlatl.

Spirulina was found in abundance at Lake Texcoco by French researchers in the 1960s, but no reference to its use by the Aztecs as a daily food source was made after the 16th century, probably because of the draining of the surrounding lakes for agriculture and urban development. The topic of tecuitlatl, which was discovered in 1520, was not mentioned again until 1940, when the Belgian phycologist Pierre Dangeard mentioned a cake called dihe consumed by the Kanembu tribe, who harvest it from Lake Chad in the African nation of Chad. Dangeard studied the dihe samples and found it to be a dried puree of the spring form of the blue-green algae from the lake. The dihe is used to make broths for meals, and also sold in markets. The spirulina is harvested from small lakes and ponds around Lake Chad.

During 1964 and 1965, the botanist Jean Leonard confirmed that dihe is made up of spirulina, and later studied a bloom of algae in a sodium hydroxide production facility. As a result, the first systematic and detailed study of the growth requirements and physiology of spirulina was performed as a basis for establishing large-scale production in the 1970s.

Food and nutrition 

Spirulina is being investigated to address food security and malnutrition, and as dietary support in long-term space flight or Mars missions. Its advantage for food security is that it needs less land and water than livestock to produce protein and energy.

Dried spirulina contains 5% water, 24% carbohydrates, 8% fat, and about 60% (51–71%) protein .

As seen in the table of nutritional value, provided in its typical supplement form as a dried powder, a 100-g amount of spirulina supplies  and is a rich source (20% or more of the Daily Value, DV) of numerous essential nutrients, particularly protein, B vitamins (thiamin, riboflavin, and niacin, providing 207%, 306%, and 85% DV, respectively), and dietary minerals, such as iron (219% DV) and manganese (90% DV). The lipid content of spirulina is 8% by weight providing the fatty acids, gamma-linolenic acid, linoleic acid, stearidonic acid, eicosapentaenoic acid (EPA), docosahexaenoic acid (DHA), and arachidonic acid. In contrast to those 2003 estimates (of DHA and EPA each at 2 to 3% of total fatty acids), 2015 research indicated that spirulina products "contained no detectable omega-3 fatty acids" (less than 0.1%, including DHA and EPA).

Vitamin B12
Spirulina contains no vitamin B12 naturally, and spirulina supplements are not considered to be a reliable source of vitamin B12, as they contain predominantly pseudovitamin B12 (Coα-[α-(7-adenyl)]-Coβ-cyanocobamide), which is biologically inactive in humans. In a 2009 position paper on vegetarian diets, the American Dietetic Association stated that spirulina is not a reliable source of active vitamin B12. The medical literature similarly advises that spirulina is unsuitable as a source of B12.

Animals and aquaculture 
Various studies on spirulina as an alternative feed for animal and aquaculture have been done. Spirulina can be fed up to 10% for poultry  and less than 4% for quail. Pigs and rabbits can receive up to 10% of the feed and increase in the spirulina content in cattle resulted in increase in milk yield and weight. Spirulina has been established as an alternative feedstock and immune booster for bigmouth buffalo, milk fish, cultured striped jack, carp, red sea bream, tilapia, catfish, yellow tail, zebrafish, shrimp, and abalone, and up to 2% spirulina per day in aquaculture feed can be safely recommended.

Research
According to the U.S. National Institutes of Health, scientific evidence is insufficient to recommend spirulina supplementation for any human condition, and more research is needed to clarify whether consumption yields any benefits. Administration of spirulina has been investigated as a way to control glucose in people with diabetes, but the European Food Safety Authority rejected those claims in 2013. Spirulina has been studied as a potential nutritional supplement for adults and children affected by HIV, but there was no conclusive effect on risk of death, body weight, or immune response.

Risks
Spirulina may have adverse interactions when taken with prescription drugs, particularly those affecting the immune system and blood clotting.

Safety and toxicology 

Spirulina is a cyanobacterium, others of which produce toxins such as microcystins. Some spirulina supplements have been found to be contaminated with microcystins, albeit at levels below the limit set by the Oregon Health Department. Microcystins can cause gastrointestinal upset, such as diarrhea, flatulence, headache, muscle pain, facial flushing, and sweating. If used chronically, liver damage may occur. The effects of chronic exposure to even low levels of microcystins are a concern due to the risk of toxicity to several organ systems.

These toxic compounds are not produced by spirulina itself, but can occur if spirulina batches are contaminated with other, toxin-producing, blue-green algae. Because the U.S. considers spirulina a dietary supplement, its government does not regulate its production and enforces no safety standards for its production or purity. The U.S. National Institutes of Health describes spirulina supplements as "possibly safe", provided they are free of microcystin contamination, but "likely unsafe" (especially for children) if contaminated. Given the lack of regulatory standards in the U.S., some public-health researchers have raised the concern that consumers cannot be certain that spirulina and other blue-green algae supplements are free of contamination. In 1999, Health Canada found that one sample of spirulina was microcystin-free. ("...0/10 samples of Spirulina contained microcystins.")

Heavy-metal contamination of spirulina supplements has also raised concern. The Chinese State Food and Drug Administration reported that lead, mercury, and arsenic contamination was widespread in spirulina supplements marketed in China. One study reported the presence of lead up to 5.1 ppm in a sample from a commercial supplement. Spirulina doses of 10 to 19 grams per day over several months have been used safely.

Safety issues for certain target groups 
Like all protein-rich foods, spirulina contains the essential amino acid phenylalanine (2.6–4.1 g/100 g), which should be avoided by people who have phenylketonuria, a rare genetic disorder that prevents the body from metabolizing phenylalanine, which then builds up in the brain, causing damage.

Spirulina contaminated with microcystins has various potential toxicity, especially to children and pregnant women, including liver damage, shock, and death.

See also
 Aphanizomenon flos-aquae

References

Edible algae
Algaculture
Cyanobacteria
Bacteria and humans
Dietary supplements
Single-cell protein

de:Spirulina
it:Spirulina platensis